In Greek mythology, Chrysopeleia (Ancient Greek: Χρυσοπέλεια) was a hamadryad nymph.

Mythology 
The most prolonged account of her is given in John Tzetzes' scholia on Lycophron, and runs as follows. The tree in which Chrysopeleia dwelt was put in danger by the waters of a flooding river. She was rescued by Arcas, who happened to be hunting in the neighborhood: he rerouted the river and secured the tree with a dam. Chrysopeleia became his lover and bore him two sons, Apheidas and Elatus.

Chrysopeleia is also mentioned in the Bibliotheca as one of the possible spouses of Arcas.

Notes

References 
 Pseudo-Apollodorus, The Library with an English Translation by Sir James George Frazer, F.B.A., F.R.S. in 2 Volumes, Cambridge, MA, Harvard University Press; London, William Heinemann Ltd. 1921. . Online version at the Perseus Digital Library. Greek text available from the same website.

Hamadryad
Women in Greek mythology